Plaza Fundadores is an urban square in Centro, Guadalajara, in the Mexican state of Jalisco.

Public artworks installed in the plaza include the Friso de los Fundadores de Guadalajara, on the exterior of Teatro Degollado, and statue of Francisco Tenamaztle.

References

External links

 

Centro, Guadalajara
Plazas in Jalisco